The spotted garden eel (Heteroconger hassi) is a heteroconger belonging to the family Congridae. It is native to the Indo-Pacific.

Description
Its body is anguiform (eel-like): long, thin, with a circular cross-section ( in average diameter) and a head of the same diameter as the body. The head appears shortened because the large mouth is close to the also large eyes. Nostrils are small and positioned in the center of the upper lip.

The body is white and covered with many small black spots. The spotted garden eel has three larger distinctive black spots; the first identifies the gills opening and the position of the tiny pectoral fins, the second is located in the central part of the body and the third one surrounds the anus. Juveniles have a very thin black body.

Distribution and habitat
The spotted garden eel is widespread throughout the tropical and subtropical waters of the Indo-Pacific from the eastern coasts of Africa including the Red Sea to Polynesia, and south from Japan to New Caledonia.

It lives exclusively in variously sized colonies on sandy bottoms that are exposed to currents, at depths from 15 to 45 meters. It digs a burrow from which emerges about a third of its body pointing their mouths towards the underwater current to catch drifting food.

Biology
As in other heteroconger species, individuals rarely leave their burrow once it is finished, but will move burrows closer together during breeding season until contact between partners is possible. Fertilized eggs and juveniles have a planktonic period before reaching sufficient size to start living in the substrate.

References

External links
 
 
 
 

Heteroconger
Taxa named by Wolfgang Klausewitz
Fish described in 1959